Charles Tillard (18 April 1851 – 7 March 1944) was an English first-class cricketer active 1871–75 who played for Surrey and Cambridge University. He was born in Wimbledon; died in Bathford.

References

1851 births
1944 deaths
English cricketers
Surrey cricketers
Cambridge University cricketers
Oxford and Cambridge Universities Past and Present cricketers
Norfolk cricketers